Warq may refer to:
 WARQ, a radio station licensed to Columbia, South Carolina, United States
 Vark, a metallic leaf used on South Asian sweets